This is a list of the winners of the National Jewish Book Award by category. The awards were established in 1950 to recognize outstanding Jewish Literature.  They are awarded by the Jewish Book Council, a New-York based non-profit organization dedicated to the support and promotion of Jewish literature since 1944.

American Jewish History 
The awards in the American Jewish History category, Celebrate 350, are presented to authors or editors of non-fiction books about the Jewish experience in North America.

Anthologies and collections 
The awards in the Anthologies and Collections category are presented to editors of books of essays, biographies, short stories, or other collected works by one or more authors.

The National Jewish Book Award in the Anthologies and Collections category was not awarded in 2014, 2017, 2018 and there was only one winner for the 2002-2003 period.

Autobiography and memoir 
The awards in the Autobiography and memoir category, the Krauss Family Awards in Memory of Simon & Shulamith (Sofi) Goldberg, are presented to authors of a family history, autobiography, personal memoir either of a Jew or family of being significantly related to the Jewish experience.

There was no winner of the National Jewish Book Award in the Autobiography and Memoir category for 1987, 1988, 2002 to 2006.

Biography 
The awards in the Biography category, In Memory of Sara Berenson Stone, are presented to authors of a biography that is significantly related to the Jewish experience.

There was no winners of the National Jewish Book Award in the Biography category between 1986 and 2018.

Biography and autobiography

Book Club Award 
The awards in the Book Club Award category, the Miller Family Awards in Memory of Helen Dunn Weinstein and June Keit Miller, are presented to authors of an outstanding work of fiction or nonfiction that inspires meaningful conversation about Jewish life, identity, practice, or history.

Children's and young adults' literature

Children's Literature 
The awards in the Children's Literature category are presented to authors (or editors) and illustrators of a Jewish-themed children book (age 0 to 11 years old).

The name the awards were known by changed on several occasions over the years:

 1952 - 1955: Issac Sigel Memorial Award
 1958: Pioneer Women's Hayim Greenberg Memorial Award
 1957 - 1967: Issac Sigel Memorial Award
 1970 - 1980: Charles and Bertie G. Schwartz Juvenile Award
 1981 - 1986: William (Zev) Frank Memorial Award Presented by Ellen and David Scheinfeld
 1987 - 1991: Anita and Martin Shapolsky Award
 1992: The Once Upon A Time Bookstore Award
 1993 - 1994: The Barbara Cohen Memorial Award
 1995 - 2019: No specific name for the award in the category

There was no National Jewish Book Award for the Children's Literature category in 1956, 1957, 1968, 1969 and for the years 2004 to 2014,

In 1970, there was two winners of the National Jewish Book Award in the Children's Literature category and only one winner for the 2002-2003 period.

Children's picture book 
The awards in the Children's Picture Book category are presented to authors and illustrators. The award was known as the Marcia and Louis Posner Awardfrom 1989 to 1993 and as Louis Posner Memorial Award from 1994 to 2001

There were no winners of the National Jewish Book Award in the Children's Picture Book category in 1984, 1995 and 1996.

Contemporary Jewish life and practices 
The awards in the Contemporary Jewish Life and Practices category are presented to authors of a non-fiction book about current tools and resources for Jewish living. The award is known as the Mimi Frank Award In Memory of Becky Levythe in 2002-2003 and as the Myra H. Kraft Memorial Awards since 2011.

Contemporary Jewish thought and experience 
The awards in the Contemporary Jewish thought and experience category, the Maurice Amado Foundation Award, are presented to authors of books about the contemporary Jewish experience.

Debut fiction 
The awards in the Debut Fiction category, the Goldberg Prizes, are presented to authors for their first published novel or short-story collection with Jewish content. The awards were known as the Foundation for Jewish Culture Goldberg Prize from 2011 to 2014. There was no prizes awarded from 2004 to 2009.

Eastern European studies 
The awards in the Eastern European Studies category, the Ronald S. Lauder Awards, are presented to authors of books about Eastern Europe. There was no winners in this category in 2001, 2003, and 2004.

Education and Jewish identity 
The awards in the Education and Jewish Identity category are presented to authors of nonfiction works, textbooks excluded, that focuses on the theory, history, or practice of Jewish education and identity. There were no winners in this category in 2007, 2009, and 2011. The award is presented In Memory of Dorothy Kripke since 2008

English poetry 
The awards in the English Poetry category are presented to the authors of Jewish poetry in English. There were no winners in this category from 1952 to 1958, in 1961, 1963, 1964, 1965, 1967, 1968, 1970 and from 1972 to 1976. At its inception, in 1951, the award was known as the Florence Dovner Memorial Poetry Award. From 1959 to 1977, it was known as the Harry and Florence Kovner Memorial Poetry Award.

Jewish book of the year 
The award for Jewish Book of the Year, the Everett Family Foundation Award, is presented to authors and editors of Jewish books.

Fiction 
The JJ Greenberg Memorial Award, named after a former President of the Jewish Book Council, is awarded to authors of a novel or short-story collection of exemplary literary merit, with Jewish content.

Food Writing and Cookbook 
The awards in the Food Writing and Cookbook category, the Jane and Stuart Weitzman Family Award, are presented to authors of cookbooks or works of food writing that explores Jewish identity, history, and culture.

History 
The awards in the History category, the Gerrard and Ella Berman Memorial Award, are presented to authors of non-fiction books concerning Jewish history.

Holocaust

Illustrated children's book 
The awards in the Illustrated Children's Book category, the Louis Posner Memorial Awards, are presented jointly to authors and illustrators of Jewish illustrated children's book.

Israel

Jewish education 
The awards in the Jewish Education category, the Leon Jolson Awards, are presented to authors of books on the subject.

Jewish family literature 
The awards in the Jewish Family Literature category, In Memory of Dorothy Kripke, are presented to authors of books on the subject.

Jewish folklore and anthropology 
The awards in the Jewish folklore and anthropology category, the Raphael Patai Award, are presented to authors and editors of books on the subject.

Jewish history

Jewish Thought

Jewish-Christian relations 
The awards in the Jewish-Christian Relations category, the Charles H. Revson Foundation Awards, are presented to authors of books on the subject.

Modern Jewish thought and experience

Non-fiction

Poetry 
The awards in the Poetry category, the Berru Award in Memory of Ruth and Bernie Weinflash, are presented to authors of books of verse consisting primarily of poems of Jewish concern.

References

Scholarship

Sephardic and Ashkenazic culture and customs 
The awards in the Sephardic and Ashkenazic Culture and Customs from 1997 to 2000, the Mimi Frank Award In Memory of Becky Levy, and in 2001, the Maurice Amado Foundation Award are presented to authors of books on the subjects.

Sephardic culture 
The awards in the Sephardic Culture category, the Mimi Frank Award In Memory of Becky Levy, are presented to authors and editors of books that explore the traditions and practices unique to Sephardic Jews.

Sephardic studies 
The awards in the Sephardic Studies category, the Maurice Amado Foundation Awards, were presented to authors and translators of sephardic studies books from 1992 to 2000. In 2001, the award's name changed to the Jewish Book Council Award.

Visual arts

Women's studies

Writing based on archival material

Yiddish language and culture

Yiddish literature

Young adult literature

Uncategorized

See also 

 National Jewish Book Award
 Jewish Book Council

References

External links 

 Past winners of the National Jewish Books Award

National Jewish Book Award
National Jewish Book Award
Jewish writers
National Jewish Book Award